Pale Blue Dot: A Vision of the Human Future in Space is a 1994 book by the astronomer Carl Sagan. It is the sequel to Sagan's 1980 book Cosmos and was inspired by the famous 1990 Pale Blue Dot photograph, for which Sagan provides a poignant description. In the book, Sagan mixes philosophy about the human place in the universe with a description of the current knowledge about the Solar System. He also details a human vision for the future.

Summary  
The first part of the book examines the claims made throughout history that Earth and the human species are unique. Sagan  proposes two reasons for the persistence of the idea of a geocentric, or Earth-centered universe: human pride in our existence, and the threat of torturing those who dissented from it, particularly during the time of the Roman Inquisition. However, he also admits that the scientific tools to prove the Earth orbited the Sun were (until the last few hundred years) not accurate enough to measure effects such as parallax, making it difficult for astronomers to prove that the geocentric theory was false.

After saying that we have gained humility from understanding that we are not literally the center of the universe, Sagan embarks on an exploration of the entire Solar System. He begins with an account of the Voyager program, in which Sagan was a participating scientist. He describes the difficulty of working with the low light levels at distant planets, and the mechanical and computer problems which beset the twin spacecraft as they aged, and which could not always be diagnosed and fixed remotely. Sagan then examines each one of the major planets, as well as some of the moons—including Titan, Triton, and Miranda—focusing on whether life is possible at the frontiers of the Solar System.

Sagan argues that studying other planets provides context for understanding the Earth—and protecting humanity's only home planet from environmental catastrophe. He believes that NASA's decision to cut back exploration of the Moon after the Apollo program was a short-sighted decision, despite its expense and declining popularity among the American public. Sagan says future exploration of space should focus on ways to protect Earth and to extend human habitation beyond it. The book was published the same year comet Shoemaker-Levy 9 crashed into Jupiter, an event Sagan uses to highlight the danger Earth faces from the occasional asteroid or comet large enough to cause substantial damage if it were to hit Earth. He says we need the political will to track large extraterrestrial objects, or we risk losing everything. Sagan argues that in order to save the human race, space colonization and terraforming should be utilized.

Later in the book, Sagan's wife, Ann Druyan, challenges readers to pick one of the other planetary dots photographed and featured in the book, and imagine that there are inhabitants on that world who believe that the universe was created solely for themselves. She shared Sagan's belief that humans are not as important as they think they are.

The first edition of the book includes an extensive list of illustrations and photographs, much of it taken from public archives of information released by NASA.

See also 

 Anthropocentrism
 Earthrise, 1968 Apollo 8 photograph
 The Blue Marble, 1972 Apollo 17 photograph
 Wanderers (2014 film)

References

External links 
 Sagan's rationale for human spaceflight Article about Carl Sagan and Pale Blue Dot
 Short audio recording of Carl Sagan describing the primary concept of his book The Pale Blue Dot at the United States Library of Congress Seth MacFarlane Collection of the Carl Sagan and Ann Druyan Archive
 A new picture of Earth taken through the rings of Saturn by the Cassini spacecraft on September 15, 2006. More information about photo.
 We Are Here: The Pale Blue Dot. A short, fan-made film on The Pale Blue Dot, released a decade after Sagan's death.  The posthumous narration is from Sagan himself, taken from one version of the audiobook version of Pale Blue Dot.
 A partial video tour of the Sagan Planet Walk monument in Ithaca, NY

1994 non-fiction books
American non-fiction books
Astronomy books
Big History
English-language books
Global civilization
Random House books
Space colonization literature
Works about the theory of history
Works by Carl Sagan